Balbeggie is a village in Perth and Kinross, Scotland about  northeast of Perth on the A94 road.

References 

Villages in Perth and Kinross